Pitcairnia aequatorialis is a species of plant in the family Bromeliaceae. It is endemic to Ecuador, where it is known from only three subpopulations in Chimborazo Province.

It grows in forested habitat. It is sometimes found in disturbed habitat. None of its populations are in protected territory.

References

aequatorialis
Endemic flora of Ecuador
Endangered plants
Taxonomy articles created by Polbot
Plants described in 1936